Lee Mi-gyu (born 4 November 1988) is a South Korean para table tennis player. She won a bronze medal at the 2016 Summer Paralympics.

She became disabled when she was three years old, following a car accident.

References 
 

1988 births 
Paralympic medalists in table tennis
South Korean female table tennis players 
Table tennis players at the 2016 Summer Paralympics 
Medalists at the 2016 Summer Paralympics 
Paralympic table tennis players of South Korea
Living people
Sportspeople from Seoul
People with paraplegia
Paralympic bronze medalists for South Korea
Table tennis players at the 2020 Summer Paralympics
21st-century South Korean women